The 1965 NC State Wolfpack football team represented North Carolina State University during the 1965 NCAA University Division football season. The Wolfpack were led by 12th-year head coach Earle Edwards and played their home games at Riddick Stadium for the last time before moving to Carter Stadium. They competed as members of the Atlantic Coast Conference. Originally finishing tied for third in the conference, forfeits by South Carolina due to an ineligible player moved NC State into a tie for first and a shared conference title with Clemson.

Schedule

References

NC State
NC State Wolfpack football seasons
Atlantic Coast Conference football champion seasons
NC State Wolfpack football